Dashtuiyeh (also Romanized as Dashtū’īyeh and Dashtūeeyeh) is a village in Horjand Rural District, Kuhsaran District, Ravar County, Kerman Province, Iran. At the 2006 census, its population was 27, in 6 families.

References 

Populated places in Ravar County